Pessina is an Italian surname. Notable people with the surname include:

Giorgio Pessina (1902–1977), Italian fencer
Giovanni Pessina (1836–1904), Italian painter
Jean Pessina, Swiss slalom canoeist
Matteo Pessina (born 1997), Italian footballer
Stefano Pessina (born 1941), Italian-born Monegasque billionaire

Italian-language surnames